Chad Brown may refer to:

 Chad Brown (basketball) (born 1996), American basketball player in the Israeli Basketball Premier League
 Chad Brown (minister) (–1650), early American Baptist minister, co-founder of Rhode Island
 Chad Brown (linebacker) (born 1970), former NFL linebacker
 Chad Brown (American football official) (1947–2016), NFL official
 Chad Brown (horse trainer) (born 1978), American racehorse trainer
 Chad Brown (poker player) (1961–2014), American poker player
 Chad Brown (politician) (born 1970), member of the Louisiana House of Representatives
 Chad Brown (soccer) (born 1975), American soccer player